Libor is the London interbank offered rate.

Libor may also refer to:

 Libor (name), Czech masculine given name
 Ullrich Libor, German sailor

See also
 Liborius (disambiguation)